Koh-e-Murdar ({{مردار) (Murdar Mountain) is a peak located in the mountain range of the Sulaiman Mountains System, located in the East of Quetta District, in western Pakistan.

The highest peak of Koh-e-Murdar mountain range is at one of the "Salore Ghasha" peaks,  /  It is the fourth highest peak in Quetta District and sixth highest peak of Balochistan.

Wildlife 
Murdar mountain has wild life animals living freely throughout the mountain including Jackals, Foxes, rabbits and Wolves and wild birds.

See also 
 List of mountains in Pakistan
 Mountain ranges of Pakistan

References

External links
 Mount Chiltan at Wikimapia.com
 Ncbi.nlm.nih.gov

Sulaiman Mountains
Mountains of Balochistan (Pakistan)
Quetta District
Three-thousanders of the Hindu Kush